Arthur Kade (born Arthur Kadyshes) is an American former financial adviser turned actor and television personality.

Raised by his grandmother in Northeast Philadelphia, he attended college at Temple University. Upon graduation, he began a career as a financial adviser with American Express Financial Advisers. In early 2009, he embarked on what he calls "The Journey", the pursuit of his lifelong dream of becoming an actor and model.

Kade appeared as an extra in one scene on Gossip Girl  and on television, radio, in blogs and newspapers, as well as in an article in Philadelphia Magazine.

He appeared in an episode of the Showtime series La La Land in which the Borat-like host Marc Wootton, hoping for "a master class in self-confidence", interviews Kade while pretending to be a London cabbie wanting to become an actor.

Critics have argued that Kade's desire is simply to become famous at whatever cost. He has been criticized for engaging in self-promotion, which has resulted in media coverage.

Kade's behavior has led some to suspect that his life is an elaborate performance art project.
Authors James Frey and Anna David met Kade to try to find out; Frey, who says Kade's website is "one of the funniest, most absurd, most ridiculous things" he's ever seen, later wrote that he and David found Kade "nice and polite" and "a real person, one that was slightly delusional about himself, but not at all resembling the buffoon on his website or in his videos". Kade later blogged that the writers were "blown away with my looks and body", called Frey "an amazing author", and rated David "a cool, classy 7.5; probably a 9 fifteen years ago".

In 2010, Kade announced he was playing a character in an attempt to create a television show in the style of comedian Sacha Baron Cohen.

In 2011, he started interviewing celebrities and currently hosts the New York City-based talk show #InTheLab with Arthur Kade.

References

External links
ArthurKade.com

Living people
Businesspeople from Philadelphia
Temple University alumni
Year of birth missing (living people)
Financial advisors